Malcolm Thomas Hastie (19 February 1929 – 8 April 2017) was an Australian water polo player. He competed in the men's tournament at the 1952 Summer Olympics. He also won the gold medal with the Australian team in the exhibition event at the 1950 British Empire Games.

References

1929 births
2017 deaths
Australian male water polo players
Olympic water polo players of Australia
Water polo players at the 1952 Summer Olympics
Place of birth missing
20th-century Australian people
Commonwealth Games gold medallists for Australia
Water polo players at the 1950 British Empire Games